The St. Vital Curling Club, located in Winnipeg, Manitoba, is a  curling club in Western Canada and was founded in 1933.  It started curling events in December 1933 in a building that was owned by the St. Vital Agricultural Society which it purchased in 1950.  It was then moved to its current location in 1954 on Regal Avenue in Winnipeg.

The club hosted it first Canadian Mixed Curling Championship in 1974.  

2017-2018 President - Pam Kok

2018-2020 President - Ken Stevens 

2020-2022 President - Jason Pruden

2022-current President - Kevin Blunden

It is the home curling club of 2014 Olympic curling champions Jennifer Jones, Kaitlyn Lawes, Jill Officer and Dawn McEwen as well as 2018 Olympic Doubles curling champion Kaitlyn Lawes.

References 

Curling clubs established in 1933
Sports venues in Winnipeg
Curling clubs in Canada
1933 establishments in Manitoba
Curling in Winnipeg
Curling_Club